Ghauri, Ghori, Ghouri, or Ghuri may refer to:

People with the surname

Ghauri
 Babar Khan Ghauri, politician from Karachi, Sindh, Pakistan
 Dilawar Khan Ghauri, governor of the Malwa province of central India during the decline of the Delhi Sultanate
 Mohammed Sultan Khan Ghauri, biologist specialist of Homoptera
 Nadeem Ghauri (born 1962), Pakistani cricketer 
 Yasmeen Ghauri (born 1971), Pakistani-Canadian supermodel

Ghori
 Ashraf Ghori (born 1973), Dubai-based Indian comic book artist, filmmaker and entrepreneur
 Ghiyath al-Din Muhammad (1140–1203), Ghurid ruler
 Muhammad of Ghor (1162–1206), most prominent ruler of the Ghurid dynasty

Ghouri 
 Aziz al-Hasan Ghouri (1884–1944), Indian poet
 Zulfiqar Ghouri, Pakistani politician

Ghuri 
 Jamshid Qarin Ghuri, military governor the city of Sari in Iran under Timur
 Al-Ashraf Qansuh al-Ghuri (1441/1446–1516), Mamluk ruler of Egypt
 Emil Ghuri (1907–1984), Palestinian politician

Other uses
 Ghauri (missile), a medium-range ballistic missile of Pakistan
 Ghori pathans, Pashtun tribe
 Ghori, Azad Kashmir or Kahori, a small town in Pakistan
 Ghoris, residents of Ghor Province, Afghanistan

See also
 Ghurid dynasty, the former rulers in parts of Afghanistan, Pakistan and India
 Ghoria disambiguation
 List of governors of Ghor, Afghanistan
 Ghor University